Cho, also known as Parque de la Reina, is a village in the municipality of Arona, on the island of Tenerife in the Canary Islands, Spain. It is situated south of the Autopista TF-1, 
1 kilometer east of the town of Guaza.

Populated places in Tenerife